The Film House is Qatar-based film, video, photography & multi-media production company, which opened in 2012.   
Justin Kramer is the CEO    and Omar Khalifa is the Head of Production

Recent Projects
The Film House has produced a TV Commercial for British Council Qatar: "DEFINITELY ABLE VOICES"  

Recognize the lyrics?  We found it amusing, although The Film House’s Justin Kramer explains it also has a serious message:
The ad is an attempt to bring a sense of humor to a serious matter. By using comedy and pop culture, we think we may be able to reach a wider audience to raise awareness about respecting the Holy month of Ramadan.

Awards
The Film House, a Qatari film, video, photography and multi-media Production Company, won two prestigious awards at The Cannes Corporate Media & TV Awards.
This festival’s edition, which was founded in 2010 to recognise the world’s finest corporate films, online media and TV documentaries, saw its biggest Qatar representation to date.
The Doha-based film house proudly accepted its awards during an exquisite Awards Gala Dinner attended by more than 270 guests on 15 October 2015 at the Palm Beach Cannes. The Film House won Silver Dolphins in Best Corporate Film for ‘The Master Craftsman’ for Qatar Luxury Group’s Anvil Rooms and Best Non-profit, Corporate Social Responsibility Film for ‘VOICES’, a film highlighting the lives of disabled people in Qatar.   

They have received a Silver Dolphin from the Cannes Corporate Media & TV Awards for the film, “Voices”, which highlights six inspiring disabled persons from different backgrounds and professions. 
They also helped Best Buddies-Qatar to produce a short film on 'No Barriers to a Great Friendship' and won awards.

References

Film production companies of Qatar
Qatari companies established in 2012
Mass media companies established in 2012